Göran Montan (born 1946) is a Swedish politician of the Moderate Party. He was a member of the Riksdag from 2006 to 2014.

References
Riksdagen: Göran Montan (m)

Members of the Riksdag from the Moderate Party
Living people
1946 births
Date of birth missing (living people)
Place of birth missing (living people)
Members of the Riksdag 2006–2010
Members of the Riksdag 2010–2014